Curtis Kennedy, who performs as Kuren, is an Australian singer, musician, record producer and rapper from Sydney, Australia. 
He has performed at Splendour in the Grass, and Southbound. He released his debut album Melting Conceptually in June 2018.

Discography

Singles
 Home Featuring (Ben Alessi)
 Mon Amour (Feat Austen)
 Mastercraft
 Bright Dawn
 Never Enough 
 KILL

EPs
 Love Lost
 Tesseract

Studio albums
 Melting Conceptually

Remixes
 Indian Summer 'Been Here Before' ft Eloise Cleary (Kuren Remix)

References

Australian musicians
Living people
1998 births